Chaldoran County is in West Azerbaijan province, Iran. The capital of the county is the city of Siah Cheshmeh, or Qara Aineh. At the 2006 census, the county's population was 143,205 in 31,291 households. The following census in 2011 counted 46,398 people in 11,364 households. At the 2016 census, the county's population was 45,060 in 11,970 households. Chaldoran is one of the tourist areas of West Azerbaijan because of its cold weather in winter and cool in summer.

History

Chaldoran is the site of the historic Battle of Chaldiran, which took place in 1514 between the armies of Ottoman Sultan Selim I and Safavid Shah Ismail I on the narrow plain outside of the town. The Ottoman army had the advantage of using firearms as well as superiority in size, and defeated the Safavid army for the first time.

After the Ottomans took this area, they resettled many of the Kurdish tribes further west.

Holy Tatavous Church (Ghare Kelisa) or St. Thaddeus's is in Chaldoran district, 7 km north east of the town of Seyah Cheshmah.

Administrative divisions

The population history of Chaldoran County's administrative divisions over three consecutive censuses is shown in the following table. The latest census shows two districts, five rural districts, and two cities.

Economy
The expansion of pastures and cultivable lands has given this region the opportunity of enjoying prosperous cattle breeding, agriculture and apiculture with highest rate of job creation in the region.  According to the census of the year 2003, population of Chaldoran district is 46,700; 33.5 percent of whom live in urban areas and 66.5 percent are rural and tribal settlers.  Chaldoran's Wednesday Market (Chaharshanbeh Bazar) enjoys a particular fame for various types of cattle, agricultural, farming products and local handicrafts. The most important tourism attractions of this city are : Holy Tatavous Church (Ghareh Kelisa), Tomb of shahid sedreddin shirazi, Tombs of Martyrs in chaldoran City and Zarzar Church in Baroum Village

References

 

Counties of West Azerbaijan Province

az:Çaldıran Şəhristanı
de:Chaldoran
fr:Chaldoran
ro:Chaldoran
tg:Чолдурон